The Co-operative Academy of Professional Education (CAPE) of Kerala, India, is an educational institution in professional fields to provide facilities for education and training. CAPE is promoted by the Co-operation Department of the Government of Kerala and is an autonomous society under the Government of Kerala. The society is registered under the Travancore-Cochin Literary, Scientific and Charitable Societies Act, 1955 on the basis of the Memorandum of Association and the rules as approved by the Government of Kerala. The Chief Minister of Kerala, Shri. Pinarayi Vijayan is the ex-officio chairman of the society. The Minister for Co-operation, Tourism, Devaswoms, Shri. [Shri. V. N. Vasavan]] is the ex-officio vice-chairman of the society and the chairman of its board of governors.

Institutions under CAPE
Under CAPE there are nine engineering colleges, one management institute and one finishing school and a hospital at Punnapra.

References

Kerala education-related lists